The 2005–06 Pittsburgh Penguins season was the team's 39th season in the National Hockey League (NHL). The season was notable for being Sidney Crosby's rookie campaign. However, Crosby's first year didn't help the team, as they suffered another losing season, finishing last place in the Eastern Conference with 58 points, the second worst in the NHL. The Penguins failed to qualify for the Stanley Cup playoffs for the fourth consecutive season. This was the most recent season where they missed the Stanley Cup playoffs. Their 16 years making the playoffs is the longest active streak in the four major North American professional sports.

Off-season

Regular season

The Penguins struggled defensively, finishing 30th overall in goals allowed, with 310 (excluding 6 shootout goals allowed).

Sidney Crosby 
Sidney Crosby was selected first overall in the 2005 NHL Entry Draft by the Penguins on July 30, 2005. Due to the labour stoppage in the previous season, the 2005 draft was conducted via a weighted lottery based on each team's playoff appearances and draft lottery victories in the last four years. This lottery system led to the draft being popularly referred to as the "Sidney Crosby Lottery" or the "Sidney Crosby Sweepstakes".

On December 16, 2005, Michel Therrien named Crosby as an alternate captain for the Penguins. The move drew criticism from some hockey pundits, including Don Cherry, who claimed that Crosby had done nothing to earn the position.

Crosby finished his rookie season with the franchise record in assists (63) and points (102) for a rookie, both of which had been previously held by Mario Lemieux. Crosby is the youngest player in the history of the NHL to score 100 points in a single season, and only the seventh rookie ever to hit the benchmark. Overall, Crosby finished sixth in the NHL scoring race and seventh in the NHL in assists. Among Canadian NHL players, he trailed only Joe Thornton and Dany Heatley. While both Crosby and Alexander Ovechkin of the Washington Capitals had impressive rookie campaigns, Crosby finished second behind Ovechkin for the Calder Memorial Trophy for NHL rookie of the year.

Through his first season, Crosby was accused by opposing players and coaches of taking dives and complaining to officials, which has been attributed to his youth.
During his rookie campaign, he was second on his team and fourth among all NHL rookies in penalty minutes, and is the only rookie to accumulate both 100 points and 100 penalty minutes in a single season in NHL history. This magnified his reputation for complaining to NHL officials.
Hockey analyst Kelly Hrudey compared Crosby to Gretzky, who had a similar reputation as a "whiner" in his youth, and suggested that as Crosby matured, he would mellow out and his reputation would fade.

Mario Lemieux 
After the lockout concluded, Lemieux returned to the ice for the 2005–06 season. Hopes for the Penguins were high due to the salary cap and revenue sharing, which enabled the team to compete in the market for several star players. Another reason for optimism was the Penguins winning the lottery for the first draft pick, enabling them to select Sidney Crosby. Lemieux opened up his home to Crosby to help the rookie settle in Pittsburgh and Lemieux also served as Crosby's mentor.

On January 24, 2006, Lemieux announced his second and permanent retirement from professional hockey at age 40. This followed a half-season in which he struggled not only with the increased speed of the "new NHL" but also with yet another threatening physical ailment, a heart condition called atrial fibrillation that caused him to experience irregular heartbeats.

Although he had put up points at a pace that most NHL forwards would be perfectly content with (22 points in 26 games) in his last season, Lemieux still remarked, "I can no longer play at a level I was accustomed to in the past."

Season standings

Schedule and results

Preseason

|- style="text-align:center; background:#ffc;"
| 1 || September 19  || Pittsburgh Penguins || 2–3 SO || Columbus Blue Jackets || Nationwide Arena || 0–0–1 
|- style="text-align:center; background:#ffc;"
| 2 || September 21  || Boston Bruins || 5–4 OT || Pittsburgh Penguins || Mohegan Sun Arena at Casey Plaza || 0–0–2
|- style="text-align:center; background:#fcf;"
| 3 || September 23  || Ottawa Senators || 3–0 || Pittsburgh Penguins || Visions Veterans Memorial Arena || 0–1–2 
|- style="text-align:center; background:#fcf;"
| 4 || September 24  || Ottawa Senators || 6–2 || Pittsburgh Penguins || Mohegan Sun Arena at Casey Plaza || 0–2–2
|- style="text-align:center; background:#fcf;"
| 5 || September 25 || Pittsburgh Penguins || 2–3 || Washington Capitals || Hersheypark Arena || 0–3–2 
|- style="text-align:center; background:#cfc;"
| 6 || September 27  || Columbus Blue Jackets || 2–7 || Pittsburgh Penguins || Mellon Arena || 1–3–2 
|- style="text-align:center; background:#fcf;"
| 7 || September 29  || Pittsburgh Penguins || 1–4 || Ottawa Senators || Corel Centre || 1–4–2
|- style="text-align:center; background:#fcf;"
| 8 || September 30  || Pittsburgh Penguins || 3–4 || Washington Capitals || Verizon Center || 1–5–2
|- style="text-align:center; background:#cfc;"
| 9 || October 2  || Washington Capitals || 1–7 || Pittsburgh Penguins || Mellon Arena || 2–5–2
|- style="text-align:center;"
| colspan=9 | Legend:       = Win       = Loss       = OT/SO Loss
|-

Regular season

|-  style="background:#fcf;"
| 1 || 5  || Pittsburgh Penguins || 1–5 || New Jersey Devils || Mellon Arena (18,101) || 0–1–0 || 0 || 
|-  style="background:#ffc;"
| 2 || 7  || Pittsburgh Penguins || 2–3 SO || Carolina Hurricanes || Mellon Arena (18,787) || 0–1–1 || 1 || 
|-  style="background:#ffc;"
| 3 || 8  || Boston Bruins || 7–6 OT || Pittsburgh Penguins || TD Banknorth Garden (17,132) || 0–1–2 || 2 || 
|-  style="background:#ffc;"
| 4 || 10  || Pittsburgh Penguins || 2–3 OT || Buffalo Sabres || Mellon Arena (12,050) || 0–1–3 || 3 || 
|-  style="background:#ffc;"
| 5 || 14  || Pittsburgh Penguins || 5–6 OT || Philadelphia Flyers || Mellon Arena (19,566) || 0–1–4 || 4 || 
|-  style="background:#fcf;"
| 6 || 15  || Tampa Bay Lightning || 3–1 || Pittsburgh Penguins || Mellon Arena  (17,132) || 0–2–4 || 4 || 
|-  style="background:#fcf;"
| 7 || 20  || New Jersey Devils || 6–3 || Pittsburgh Penguins || Mellon Arena (16,082) || 0–3–4 || 4 || 
|-  style="background:#fcf;"
| 8 || 22  || Pittsburgh Penguins || 3–6 || Boston Bruins || Mellon Arena (17,565) || 0–4–4 || 4 || 
|-  style="background:#ffc;"
| 9 || 25  || Florida Panthers || 4–3 OT || Pittsburgh Penguins || Mellon Arena (14,636) || 0–4–5 || 5 || 
|-  style="background:#cfc;"
| 10 || 27  || Atlanta Thrashers || 5–7 || Pittsburgh Penguins || Mellon Arena (14,009) || 1–4–5 || 7 || 
|-  style="background:#fcf;"
| 11 || 29  || Carolina Hurricanes || 5–3 || Pittsburgh Penguins || Mellon Arena (16,420) || 1–5–5 || 7 || 
|-

|-  style="background:#cfc;"
| 12 || 1  || Pittsburgh Penguins || 4–3 OT || New Jersey Devils || Mellon Arena (10,134) || 2–5–5 || 9 || 
|-  style="background:#cfc;"
| 13 || 3  || Pittsburgh Penguins || 5–1 || New York Islanders || Nassau Veterans Memorial Coliseum (14,415) || 3–5–5 || 11 || 
|-  style="background:#fcf;"
| 14 || 5  || Pittsburgh Penguins || 3–6 || Boston Bruins || Mellon Arena (17,565) || 3–6–5 || 11 || 
|-  style="background:#cfc;"
| 15 || 7  || Pittsburgh Penguins || 3–2 || New York Rangers || Mellon Arena (18,200) || 4–6–5 || 13 || 
|-  style="background:#fcf;"
| 16 || 9  || Pittsburgh Penguins || 0–5 || Atlanta Thrashers || Mellon Arena (14,046) || 4–7–5 || 13 || 
|-  style="background:#cfc;"
| 17 || 10  || Montreal Canadiens || 2–3 SO || Pittsburgh Penguins || Mellon Arena (16,254) || 5–7–5 || 15 || 
|-  style="background:#fcf;"
| 18 || 12  || New York Rangers || 6–1 || Pittsburgh Penguins || Madison Square Garden (IV) (17,132) || 5–8–5 || 15 || 
|-  style="background:#ffc;"
| 19 || 14  || New York Islanders || 3–2 SO || Pittsburgh Penguins || Mellon Arena (10,793) || 5–8–6 || 16 || 
|-  style="background:#cfc;"
| 20 || 16  || Pittsburgh Penguins || 3–2 OT || Philadelphia Flyers || Mellon Arena (19,687) || 6–8–6 || 18 || 
|-  style="background:#fcf;"
| 21 || 19  || Philadelphia Flyers || 6–3 || Pittsburgh Penguins || Wachovia Center (17,132) || 6–9–6 || 18 || 
|-  style="background:#cfc;"
| 22 || 22  || Washington Capitals || 4–5 || Pittsburgh Penguins || Verizon Center (16,978) || 7–9–6 || 20 || 
|-  style="background:#fcf;"
| 23 || 25  || Pittsburgh Penguins || 3–6 || Florida Panthers || Mellon Arena (18,124) || 7–10–6 || 20 || 
|-  style="background:#fcf;"
| 24 || 27  || Pittsburgh Penguins || 1–4 || Tampa Bay Lightning || Mellon Arena (20,218) || 7–11–6 || 20 || 
|-  style="background:#fcf;"
| 25 || 29  || Buffalo Sabres || 3–2 || Pittsburgh Penguins || HSBC Arena (15,118) || 7–12–6 || 20 || 
|-

|-  style="background:#fcf;"
| 26 || 1  || Pittsburgh Penguins || 1–2 || New York Rangers || Mellon Arena (18,200) || 7–13–6 || 20 || 
|-  style="background:#fcf;"
| 27 || 3  || Calgary Flames || 3–2 || Pittsburgh Penguins || Pengrowth Saddledome (16,626) || 7–14–6 || 20 || 
|-  style="background:#fcf;"
| 28 || 8  || Minnesota Wild || 5–0 || Pittsburgh Penguins || Xcel Energy Center (14,627) || 7–15–6 || 20 || 
|-  style="background:#cfc;"
| 29 || 10  || Colorado Avalanche || 3–4 || Pittsburgh Penguins || Mellon Arena (16,677) || 8–15–6 || 22 || 
|-  style="background:#fcf;"
| 30 || 12  || Pittsburgh Penguins || 1–3 || Detroit Red Wings || Mellon Arena (20,066) || 8–16–6 || 22 || 
|-  style="background:#fcf;"
| 31 || 13  || Pittsburgh Penguins || 0–3 || St. Louis Blues || Mellon Arena (14,336) || 8–17–6 || 22 || 
|-  style="background:#ffc;"
| 32 || 16  || Buffalo Sabres || 4–3 OT || Pittsburgh Penguins || HSBC Arena (16,648) || 8–17–7 || 23 || 
|-  style="background:#fcf;"
| 33 || 17  || Pittsburgh Penguins || 3–4 || Buffalo Sabres || Mellon Arena (18,690) || 8–18–7 || 23 || 
|-  style="background:#fcf;"
| 34 || 23  || Philadelphia Flyers || 5–4 || Pittsburgh Penguins || Wachovia Center (17,132) || 8–19–7 || 23 || 
|-  style="background:#ffc;"
| 35 || 27  || Toronto Maple Leafs || 3–2 OT || Pittsburgh Penguins || Air Canada Centre (17,132) || 8–19–8 || 24 || 
|-  style="background:#cfc;"
| 36 || 29  || New Jersey Devils || 2–6 || Pittsburgh Penguins || Izod Center (17,132) || 9–19–8 || 26 || 
|-  style="background:#cfc;"
| 37 || 31  || New York Rangers || 3–4 OT || Pittsburgh Penguins || Madison Square Garden (IV) (17,132) || 10–19–8 || 28 || 
|-

|-  style="background:#ffc;"
| 38 || 2  || Pittsburgh Penguins || 2–3 OT || Toronto Maple Leafs || Mellon Arena (19,449) || 10–19–9 || 29 || 
|-  style="background:#cfc;"
| 39 || 3  || Pittsburgh Penguins || 6–4 || Montreal Canadiens || Mellon Arena (21,273) || 11–19–9 || 31 || 
|-  style="background:#fcf;"
| 40 || 6  || Pittsburgh Penguins || 4–6 || Atlanta Thrashers || Mellon Arena (17,209) || 11–20–9 || 31 || 
|-  style="background:#fcf;"
| 41 || 7  || Atlanta Thrashers || 4–3 || Pittsburgh Penguins || Philips Arena (17,132) || 11–21–9 || 31 || 
|-  style="background:#fcf;"
| 42 || 10  || Edmonton Oilers || 3–1 || Pittsburgh Penguins || Rexall Place (14,905) || 11–22–9 || 31 || 
|-  style="background:#fcf;"
| 43 || 11  || Pittsburgh Penguins || 1–6 || Columbus Blue Jackets || Mellon Arena (18,136) || 11–23–9 || 31 || 
|-  style="background:#fcf;"
| 44 || 13  || Pittsburgh Penguins || 1–4 || Chicago Blackhawks || Mellon Arena (20,541) || 11–24–9 || 31 || 
|-  style="background:#fcf;"
| 45 || 15  || Pittsburgh Penguins || 4–5 || Nashville Predators || Mellon Arena (17,113) || 11–25–9 || 31 || 
|-  style="background:#fcf;"
| 46 || 16  || Vancouver Canucks || 4–2 || Pittsburgh Penguins || General Motors Place (15,681) || 11–26–9 || 31 || 
|-  style="background:#fcf;"
| 47 || 19  || New York Rangers || 4–2 || Pittsburgh Penguins || Madison Square Garden (IV) (14,272) || 11–27–9 || 31 || 
|-  style="background:#fcf;"
| 48 || 21  || Philadelphia Flyers || 2–1 || Pittsburgh Penguins || Wachovia Center (17,132) || 11–28–9 || 31 || 
|-  style="background:#fcf;"
| 49 || 23  || Pittsburgh Penguins || 2–4 || Philadelphia Flyers || Mellon Arena (19,726) || 11–29–9 || 31 || 
|-  style="background:#cfc;"
| 50 || 25  || Washington Capitals || 1–8 || Pittsburgh Penguins || Verizon Center (14,415) || 12–29–9 || 33 || 
|-  style="background:#ffc;"
| 51 || 26  || Pittsburgh Penguins || 3–4 SO || New York Islanders || Nassau Veterans Memorial Coliseum (16,362) || 12–29–10 || 34 || 
|-  style="background:#fcf;"
| 52 || 28  || Pittsburgh Penguins || 1–7 || New York Rangers || Mellon Arena (18,200) || 12–30–10 || 34 || 
|-

|-  style="background:#fcf;"
| 53 || 1  || Pittsburgh Penguins || 1–3 || New York Rangers || Mellon Arena (18,200) || 12–31–10 || 34 || 
|-  style="background:#fcf;"
| 54 || 2  || Ottawa Senators || 7–2 || Pittsburgh Penguins || Corel Centre (14,714) || 12–32–10 || 34 || 
|-  style="background:#ffc;"
| 55 || 4  || New York Islanders || 5–4 SO || Pittsburgh Penguins || Mellon Arena (11,218) || 12–32–11 || 35 || 
|-  style="background:#fcf;"
| 56 || 6  || Pittsburgh Penguins || 2–5 || Ottawa Senators || Mellon Arena (19,877) || 12–33–11 || 35 || 
|-  style="background:#fcf;"
| 57 || 8  || Boston Bruins || 3–1 || Pittsburgh Penguins || TD Banknorth Garden (15,603) || 12–34–11 || 35 || 
|-  style="background:#cfc;"
| 58 || 10  || Pittsburgh Penguins || 4–3 || Carolina Hurricanes || Mellon Arena (18,830) || 13–34–11 || 37 || 
|-  style="background:#cfc;"
| 59 || 11  || Pittsburgh Penguins || 6–3 || Washington Capitals || Mellon Arena (18,277) || 14–34–11 || 39 || 
|-

|-  style="background:#fcf;"
| 60 || 1  || Ottawa Senators || 4–3 || Pittsburgh Penguins || Corel Centre (14,026) || 14–35–11 || 39 || 
|-  style="background:#fcf;"
| 61 || 4  || Carolina Hurricanes || 7–5 || Pittsburgh Penguins || RBC Center (16,293) || 14–36–11 || 39 || 
|-  style="background:#ffc;"
| 62 || 7  || Tampa Bay Lightning || 5–4 SO || Pittsburgh Penguins || St. Pete Times Forum (15,048) || 14–36–12 || 40 || 
|-  style="background:#fcf;"
| 63 || 8  || Pittsburgh Penguins || 3–6 || Washington Capitals || Mellon Arena (14,374) || 14–37–12 || 40 || 
|-  style="background:#cfc;"
| 64 || 11  || New Jersey Devils || 3–6 || Pittsburgh Penguins || Izod Center (16,061) || 15–37–12 || 42 || 
|-  style="background:#cfc;"
| 65 || 12  || Philadelphia Flyers || 0–2 || Pittsburgh Penguins || Wachovia Center (14,904) || 16–37–12 || 44 || 
|-  style="background:#fcf;"
| 66 || 16  || Pittsburgh Penguins || 1–2 || New Jersey Devils || Mellon Arena (11,513) || 16–38–12 || 44 || 
|-  style="background:#cfc;"
| 67 || 18  || Pittsburgh Penguins || 5–4 || Montreal Canadiens || Mellon Arena (21,273) || 17–38–12 || 46 || 
|-  style="background:#fcf;"
| 68 || 19  || Toronto Maple Leafs || 1–0 || Pittsburgh Penguins || Air Canada Centre (15,174) || 17–39–12 || 46 || 
|-  style="background:#fcf;"
| 69 || 21  || Pittsburgh Penguins || 2–5 || Ottawa Senators || Mellon Arena (19,360) || 17–40–12 || 46 || 
|-  style="background:#cfc;"
| 70 || 24  || New York Islanders || 3–4 OT || Pittsburgh Penguins || Mellon Arena (11,286) || 18–40–12 || 48 || 
|-  style="background:#fcf;"
| 71 || 26  || Montreal Canadiens || 6–5 || Pittsburgh Penguins || Bell Centre (14,807) || 18–41–12 || 48 || 
|-  style="background:#fcf;"
| 72 || 29  || Florida Panthers || 5–3 || Pittsburgh Penguins || BankAtlantic Center (14,024) || 18–42–12 || 48 || 
|-  style="background:#cfc;"
| 73 || 31  || Pittsburgh Penguins || 4–0 || New York Islanders || Nassau Veterans Memorial Coliseum (15,210) || 19–42–12 || 50 || 
|-

|-  style="background:#ffc;"
| 74 || 2  || New Jersey Devils || 3–2 OT || Pittsburgh Penguins || Izod Center (14,427) || 19–42–13 || 51 || 
|-  style="background:#fcf;"
| 75 || 5  || Pittsburgh Penguins || 4–6 || New Jersey Devils || Mellon Arena (13,118) || 19–43–13 || 51 || 
|-  style="background:#cfc;"
| 76 || 7  || Pittsburgh Penguins || 5–1 || Florida Panthers || Mellon Arena (14,776) || 20–43–13 || 53 || 
|-  style="background:#fcf;"
| 77 || 8  || Pittsburgh Penguins || 0–1 || Tampa Bay Lightning || Mellon Arena (20,844) || 20–44–13 || 53 || 
|-  style="background:#fcf;"
| 78 || 11  || Pittsburgh Penguins || 3–4 || Philadelphia Flyers || Mellon Arena (19,756) || 20–45–13 || 53 || 
|-  style="background:#cfc;"
| 79 || 13  || New York Rangers || 3–5 || Pittsburgh Penguins || Madison Square Garden (IV) (15,155) || 21–45–13 || 55 || 
|-  style="background:#ffc;"
| 80 || 15  || Pittsburgh Penguins || 4–5 SO || New York Islanders || Nassau Veterans Memorial Coliseum (17,084) || 21–45–14 || 56 || 
|-  style="background:#cfc;"
| 81 || 17  || New York Islanders || 1–6 || Pittsburgh Penguins || Mellon Arena (12,282) || 22–45–14 || 58 || 
|-  style="background:#fcf;"
| 82 || 18  || Pittsburgh Penguins || 3–5 || Toronto Maple Leafs || Mellon Arena (19,392) || 22–46–14 || 58 || 
|-

|- style="text-align:center;"
| ''Legend:       = Win       = Loss       = OT/SO Loss

Player statistics

Scoring
 Position abbreviations: C = Center; D = Defense; G = Goaltender; LW = Left Wing; RW = Right Wing
  = Joined team via a transaction (e.g., trade, waivers, signing) during the season. Stats reflect time with the Penguins only.
  = Left team via a transaction (e.g., trade, waivers, release) during the season. Stats reflect time with the Penguins only.

Goaltending

Awards and records

Awards

Milestones 
 Sidney Crosby played his first professional NHL game on October 5, 2005, against the New Jersey Devils, and registered an assist on the team's first goal of the season, scored by Mark Recchi in a 5–1 loss.
 November 11, 2005 – Sidney Crosby beat Jose Theodore of the Montreal Canadiens to win his first career shootout.
 November 11, 2005- Mario Lemieux scores his seventh goal of the season, and the last of his career.
 November 22, 2005 – Sidney Crosby and Alexander Ovechkin face each other for the first time.
 March 12, 2006 – Marc-Andre Fleury gets a shutout by stopping 22 shots against the Philadelphia Flyers.
 March 29, 2006 – John LeClair scores the 400th goal of his career.
 January 24, 2006 – Mario Lemieux announces his retirement.
 April 13, 2006 – Sidney Crosby scores four points in one game, including his 90th point of the season.
 April 17, 2006 – Sidney Crosby becomes the youngest player to score 100 points in one season.

Transactions
The Penguins were involved in the following transactions from February 17, 2005, the day after the 2004–05 NHL season was officially cancelled, through June 19, 2006, the day of the deciding game of the 2006 Stanley Cup Finals.

Trades

Players acquired

Players lost

Signings

Other

Draft picks

Notes

References

Pitts
Pitts
Pittsburgh Penguins seasons
Pitts
Pitts